Before the Streets is a 2016 Canadian drama film directed by Chloé Leriche. Set among the Atikamekw people of northern Quebec, the film stars Rykko Bellemare as Shawnouk, a man undertaking the process of restorative justice after accidentally killing someone in the process of committing a crime.

The film's cast also includes Martin Dubreuil, Kwena Bellemare-Boivin and Jacques Newashish.

Accolades
The film won the award for best picture, and Leriche won the award for best director, at the 2016 Whistler Film Festival. At the 2016 Directors Guild of Canada awards, Leriche won the DGC Discovery Award.

The film garnered six nominations at the 5th Canadian Screen Awards in 2017, including Best Motion Picture.

References

External links
 

2016 films
2016 drama films
Atikamekw
Canadian drama films
First Nations films
Quebec films
2010s Canadian films